The Iowa High School Athletic Association (IHSAA) is the regulating body for male Iowa high school interscholastic athletics and is a full member of the National Federation of State High School Associations. Its female counterpart, the Iowa Girls High School Athletic Union, (IGHSAU) is an associate member. Iowa is the only state that maintains separate governing bodies for boys' and girls' athletics.

Sports overseen by the IHSAA are baseball, basketball, bowling, cross country, football, golf, soccer, swimming & diving, tennis, track & field, and wrestling.

As classifications vary highly across sports, they are included under the individual sport section.

Administrative staff
The administrative staff that runs the IHSAA consists of the 7 members in the office of directors, and the 10 members of the board of control.

Board of directors
Executive Director- Tom Keating
Assistant Director- Brett Nanninga
Assistant Director- Todd Tharp
Assistant Director- Jared Chizek
Assistant Director Chad Elsberry 
Director of Officials- Lewis Curtis
Communications Director- Chris Cuellar

Board of control

Chairperson: Greg Darling, Humboldt, 2021
Vice-Chairperson: Dr. Rod Earleywine, Sergeant Bluff-Luton, 2020
Treasurer: Barb Schwamman, Osage, 2010
Greg Dockum, Johnston, IASB, 2021
Brent Cook, Dubuque, Senior, 2022
Paula Wright, Oskaloosa, 2019
Scott Kibby, Iowa City, Liberty, 2023
Dave Wiebers, Denison-Schleswig, 2023
Dr. Ryan Wise, ex-officio, Department of Education

Baseball

The IHSAA, historically, has had 3 state baseball championships. Currently, there is only one: the Summer State Championship,  whose winners are currently recognized as the State Champions. Historically, however, the winners of all 3 tournaments are given credit for State Championships.  Iowa was the first State Association in the nation to hold a baseball championship meet in the summer.

Classification guidelines
4A- Largest 48 schools
3A- Next 64 largest schools
2A- Next 96 largest schools
1A- Remaining (138) schools

State Champions

Summer Tournament

The summer tournament was first held in 1946, with one classification from 1946–1972. From 1973–1980, there were 2 classifications (1A and 2A), and since 1981 there have been 4 classifications (1A, 2A, 3A, and 4A).

Spring Tournament
The Spring Tournament was held every summer from 1928–1972, and is the oldest of the 3 state tournaments. In the 4 years prior to 1928 (1924–1927), Iowa State College hosted an "invitational state tournament" in the spring that attracted nearly 40 schools, but was unofficial in nature. Unlike the Summer tournament, the Spring tournament never divided into separate classes.

Fall Tournament
The Fall Tournament was held every summer from 1939–1985. Unlike the Summer tournament, the Fall tournament never divided into separate classes. .

Basketball

Classification guidelines
4A- Largest 48 schools
3A- Next 64 largest schools
2A- Next 96 largest schools*
1A- Remaining (155) schools

*IHSAA Board policy allows schools to participate in a higher classification than their enrollment places them in a sport with four classes. Schools requesting this placement will remain in higher class for two years. As a result, In the 2014-15 school year, there were 97 schools in 2A basketball, even though regulations call for 96

State Champions

Timeline
1912–1919 – unsupervised, non IHSAA sponsored state championship crowning one state champion.
1920–1922 – unsupervised, non IHSAA sponsored state championship crowning two state champions, one in Iowa City and one in Ames.
1923 – supervised, IHSAA sponsored state championship crowning one state champion; round robin format
1924 – no state champion listed according to IHSAA website
1925–1926 – supervised, IHSAA sponsored state championship crowning two state champions in "A" and "B" divisions; round robin format
1927–1955 – supervised, IHSAA sponsored state championship crowning one state champion
1956–1960 – supervised, IHSAA sponsored state championship crowning two state champions in "A" and "B" divisions
1961–1966 – supervised, IHSAA sponsored state championship crowning one state champion
1967–1974 – supervised, IHSAA sponsored state championship crowning two state champions in "1A" and "2A" classes
1975–1984 – supervised, IHSAA sponsored state championship crowning three state champions in "1A", "2A", and "3A" classes.
1985–1992 – supervised, IHSAA sponsored state championship crowning four state champions in "A", "1A", "2A", and "3A" classes.
1993–present – supervised, IHSAA sponsored state championship crowning four state champions in "1A", "2A", "3A" and "4A" classes.

Bowling
Bowling was first sanctioned by the IHSAA in 2009–2010.

State Champions

Cross country
Cross Country was first contested in Iowa in 1922, and is considered a fall sport. It is also the only sport that is jointly sanctioned by the IHSAA and the IGHSAU. The current official distance for cross country meets is 5000m (approximately 3.1 miles). The standard format for team scoring, per NFHS guidelines, is to sum the places of the 5 highest placing runners among qualifying teams (teams must have at least 5 runners to qualify in the context of the team competition) to obtain the team's score. Teams are then ranked with the lowest score winning. Additionally, a team may have up to 7 runners count in placing for team scores, although only the first 5 scores, with the 6th and 7th runners serving to displace and lower the position of runners on other teams.

Classification guidelines
In classifying Cross Country programs, due to the collaboration of the IHSAA and IGHSAU, teams are included in the largest 48, next 64, etc., on the basis of having either a boys or a girls program, as not all schools have both. This is to avoid a situation where boys and girls from the same school do not compete in the same class.

4A- Largest 48 schools
3A- Next 64 largest schools
2A- Next 72 largest schools
1A- Remaining Schools (136)

State Champions

Timeline
1922–1929 – unsanctioned, unsupervised State Championship crowning one individual and one team state champion. Race length-2 miles
1930–1934 – sanctioned, supervised State Championship crowning one individual and one team state champion. Race length-2 miles
1935 – sanctioned, supervised State Championship crowning one individual and one team state champion. Race length-1.9 miles
1936 sanctioned, supervised State Championship crowning one individual and two team state champions. Race length-1.9 miles
1937–1946 – sanctioned, supervised State Championship crowning three individual and three team state champions. Race length-1.9 miles
1947 – sanctioned, supervised State Championship crowning four individual and no team state champions. Race length-1.9 miles
1948–1950 – sanctioned, supervised State Championship crowning four individual and four team state champions. Race length-1.9 miles
1951–1956 – sanctioned, supervised State Championship crowning four individual and four team state champions. Race length-1.8 miles
1957–1963 – sanctioned, supervised State Championship crowning five individual and five team state champions. Race length-1.8 miles
1964–1966 – sanctioned, supervised State Championship crowning six individual and six team state champions. Race length-1.8 miles
1967–1968 – sanctioned, supervised State Championship crowning six individual and six team state champions. Race length-2.0 miles
1969–1975  – sanctioned, supervised State Championship crowning seven individual and seven team state champions. Race length-2.0 miles
1976–1980 – sanctioned, supervised State Championship crowning four individual and four team state champions. Race length-2.0 miles
1981–1986 – sanctioned, supervised State Championship crowning three individual and three team state champions. Race length-2.0 miles
1987–2002 – sanctioned, supervised State Championship crowning three individual and three team state champions. Race length-5000 meters
2003–present – sanctioned, supervised State Championship crowning four individual and four team state champions. Race length-5000 meters

Football

Classification guidelines

Football classifications remain the same for 2 years, following remain the same for the 2021 and 2022 football seasons.

5A- Largest 36 schools by enrollment
4A- Next Largest 36
3A- Next Largest 36
2A- Next Largest 48
1A- Next Largest 48
A- Remaining 11 player schools (56)
8-player- Option for schools with an enrollment of 120 or less (72)

State Champions
Although different sources claim that certain schools to have been state champions in years prior to 1972, these championships are not apparently recognized by the IHSAA and are not listed on its website, and it is not clear how these championships were determined. 8-Player started having postseason in 2000, the previous two years were regular season due to low number of teams.

Golf
The standard team scoring format for golf tournaments, per NFHS guidelines, is to add up the scores of 6 players with each player playing 2 rounds of 18 holes. Teams are then ranked according to lowest score.

Classification guidelines
4A (fall golf) – Largest 48 schools*
3A (spring golf) – Next 64
2A (spring golf) – Next 96
1A (spring golf) – Remainder (129)
*Plus golf schools that play in 4A conferences that wish to play in the fall. In 2006–2007 there were 52 schools in class 4A

State Champions

Fall Tournament
In 1940, 1941, and 1986–1993, teams could also participate in a separate Fall Championship. Listed below are the champions of those tournaments. Beginning in 1994, the Fall tournament became simply the 4A championship. Those results are included above.

Soccer

Classification guidelines
3A- Largest 36 schools (initiated in 2011)
2A- Next Largest 48 schools
1A- Remaining schools

State Champions
The current State Champion is the winner of the spring tournament that has been held since 1995 and was divided into 2 classes in 1998 and 3 classes starting in 2011. From 1994–2000, there was also a fall State Championship tournament that crowned a single champion. Winners of both tournaments are considered State Champions.

Swimming & diving

Classification guidelines

State Champions

Tennis
An IHSAA tennis team consists of 6 competitors. Each head-to-head competition is made of 6 singles and 3 doubles, each worth 1 point, and the first team to 5 points is the winner. Both singles and doubles matches are in a best-of-3-sets format. With a 10-point tiebreaker in the 3rd in most cases.

Classification guidelines

2A- Largest 48
1A- Remaining (61) schools

State Champions

Timeline
1929–1977 – one singles and one doubles championship awarded
1978–present – two singles and two doubles championships awarded, one in each of 2 classes (1A and 2A)
1983–present – two team championships awarded, one in each of 2 classes (1A and 2A)

Track & Field

Iowa's official track season is currently outdoors. There was also an indoor State Track Meet from 1926–1973, and the IHSAA is in the process of collecting and publishing these champions.

Classification guidelines

4A- Largest 48 schools
3A- Next 64 largest schools
2A- Next 96 largest schools
1A- Remaining (165) schools

List of eventsIndex Page
The following is the current list of official track events according to the IHSAA

Track:
100 meter dash
200 meter dash
400 meter dash
800 meter run
1600 meter run
3200 meter run
110 meter hurdles
400 meter hurdles
4 × 100 meter relay
4 × 200 meter relay
4 × 400 meter relay
4 × 800 meter relay
 800 meter sprint Medley relay
1600 meter distance Medley relay
4 × 110 meter hurdle shuttle relay

Field:
High jump
Long jump
Discus throw
Shot put

Wheel Chair:
100 meter run wheelchair
200 meter run wheelchair
400 meter run wheelchair
Shot put wheelchair

State Champions
State track titles have been given every year since 1906. Since 2003, there has also been wheelchair events at the state meet. A separate wheelchair team championship is also awarded. In 2005, the wheelchair championship has been co-ed.

Wrestling

Classification guidelines

3A- Largest 64 schools
2A- Next 96 largest schools
1A- Remaining (129) schools

Weight classifications

106 pounds – recent champ – Justin Portillo 
113 pounds – recent champ – Josh Portillo
120 pounds – recent champ – Brook Stephens
126 pounds – recent champ – Cain Johanns
132 pounds – recent champ – Joel Haberman
138 pounds – recent champ – Reno Chiri
145 pounds – recent champ – Kollyn Buch
152 pounds – recent champ -
160 pounds – recent champ – Mason Christe
170 pounds – recent champ – Tim Riggins
182 pounds – recent champ – Chance Turner
195 pounds – recent champ – Jacob Dykes
220 pounds – recent champ – Dedric Kettwick
285 pounds – recent champ – Spencer Trenary

State Champions
The Iowa High School Athletic Association holds two separate team wrestling championships: the Traditional tournament, which also crowns individual champions, and a Dual Team tournament. The dual team tournament was held at the U.S. Cellular Center in Cedar Rapids a week after the traditional tournament, until 2012, when it was held the Wednesday before the traditional tournament in Des Moines. This was the subject of much controversy, as several teams sat their state qualifiers for the Dual Team tournament. In 1921–1925, the State University of Iowa (Iowa City) and Iowa State University (Ames) held open state tournaments that were not supervised nor sanctioned by the IHSAA.

Broadcasting
Prior to 2016, championship events in football, basketball and wrestling were carried across the state of Iowa on a network made up of local television stations. Beginning with the 2016 football championships, IHSAA reached a deal with NBCUniversal-owned Comcast SportsNet Chicago to become the exclusive provider of these sports, making them available across CSN's footprint consisting of Iowa, Illinois and Indiana via television, online and the NBC Sports mobile app.

References

 
High school sports associations in the United States